ShoXC is a mixed martial arts series produced by the mixed martial arts organization EliteXC, Showtime and Proelite.com.  The series was announced on July 11, 2007.  The purpose of the show is to highlight up and coming MMA fighters.

On October 20, 2008, ProElite, the parent company of EliteXC, informed its employees and fighters that they were shutting down. The company filed for bankruptcy protection and all future events were canceled. A breakdown in the negotiations with Showtime Networks to purchase ProElite resulted in the company's funding to disappear, forcing them out of business. ShoXC events were later replaced on Showtime by ShoMMA events put on by Strikeforce, after purchasing EliteXC's assets.

ShoXC 1

The inaugural event took place on July 27, 2007 at the Chumash Casino in Santa Ynez, California and aired on the Showtime cable network. In a unique twist, the traditional "preliminary" matches were fought after the main televised bouts. These matches were streamed live via the ProElite website.

ShoXC 2

During the July 27th streaming event, it was announced the next ShoXC card would take place on Showtime on Saturday, August 25, 2007, putting the EliteXC event head-to-head with UFC 74.  The event took place in Vicksburg, Mississippi.  The main event was the rematch between Charles Bennett and Victor Valenzuela, which was originally scheduled for Strikeforce Shamrock vs. Baroni.

ShoXC 3
On the August 25th broadcast, it was announced that the next edition of ShoXC would take place on October 26, 2007 on Showtime at the Chumash Casino in Santa Ynez, California.

ShoXC 4 
The fourth edition of ShoXC took place on January 25, 2008 at the Trump Taj Mahal in Atlantic City, New Jersey.

ShoXC 5
On the January 25th ShoXC, it was announced the next event would take place on March 21, 2008 in California.

ShoXC 6
The sixth edition of ShoXC took place on April 5, 2008 at the Table Mountain Casino in Friant, California.

ShoXC 7
The seventh edition of ShoXC took place on August 15, 2008 at the Table Mountain Casino in Friant, California.  The main event featured a rematch between Jared Hamman and Po'ai Suganuma, who initially fought on the April 5th card.

ShoXC 8
The eighth entry of ShoXC took place on September 26, 2008 at the Chumash Casino in Santa Ynez, California and aired on the Showtime cable network.  In the main event, Wilson Reis became the first ever EliteXC Bantamweight Champion.

ShoXC 9
The ninth and final edition of ShoXC took place on October 10, 2008 at the Horseshoe Casino in Hammond, Indiana and aired on the Showtime cable network.

See also
 List of EliteXC events

References

External links
Official EliteXC Site
Official Showtime Networks, Inc. Site
Exclusive EliteXC Interviews and Fighter Bios

Elite Xtreme Combat events
2007 in mixed martial arts
2008 in mixed martial arts
Mixed martial arts television shows
2007 American television series debuts
2008 American television series endings
Showtime (TV network) original programming